Ratu Rakuita Solesole Sauramaeva Vakalalabure is a Fijian chief, politician and member of the Parliament of Fiji. He is a member of the People's Alliance.

He was selected as a PA candidate in the 2022 Fijian general election, and was elected to Parliament, winning 2460 votes. On 24 December 2022 he was appointed Assistant Minister for Home Affairs in the coalition government of Sitiveni Rabuka.

References

Living people
Fijian chiefs
People's Alliance (Fiji) politicians
Members of the Parliament of Fiji
Year of birth missing (living people)